Rano is an islet off the north-eastern coast of Malakula in Vanuatu. The 1999 census showed a population of 273, which increased in 2009 to 304.

References

Islands of Vanuatu
Malampa Province